Doctor Who Magazine (abbreviated as DWM) is a magazine devoted to the long-running British science fiction television series Doctor Who. Launched in 1979 as Doctor Who Weekly, the magazine became a monthly publication the following year. Now with 13 issues a year, as well as currently producing triannual deluxe Special Editions (2002–) and Bookazines (2013–), the publication features behind the scenes articles on the TV show and other media, as well as producing its own world famous comic strip. Its founding editor was Dez Skinn, and the incumbent editor is Marcus Hearn, who took over from the magazine's longest-serving editor, Tom Spilsbury, in July 2017. DWM is recognised by Guinness World Records as the longest running TV tie-in magazine, celebrating 40 years of continuous publication on 11 October 2019.

History 
Originally geared towards children and predominately featuring comic strips, DWM slowly transformed into a mature magazine, expanding to explore behind-the-scenes aspects of the series and developing the comic strip. Due to its longevity, it is seen as a source of 'official' and exclusive information, sharing a close relationship with the television production team and the BBC.

Marvel years (1979–1995) 

Officially licensed by the BBC, the magazine began life as Doctor Who Weekly in 1979, published by the UK arm of Marvel Comics. The first issue was released on Thursday 11 October with a cover date of 17 October and priced 12p.

The magazine moved from weekly to monthly publication with issue 44 in September 1980, becoming Doctor Who – A Marvel Monthly with a cover price of 30p – although the tagline was not part of the name, but simply a descriptor which appeared on many of Marvel UK's monthly titles at that point. The indicia continued describing the publication as 'Doctor Who Weekly' until issue 48. The cover title changed to Doctor Who Monthly with issue 61, and then to The Official Doctor Who Magazine with issue 85 in February 1984. It became The Doctor Who Magazine with issue 99 in April 1985, and simply Doctor Who Magazine with issue 107 in December 1985. The magazine has remained under that title ever since; an exception was made for issue 397 (June 2008) when the cover featured only the words Bad Wolf, following transmission of the Doctor Who episode "Turn Left" on Saturday 21 June.

Despite the BBC discontinuing production of Doctor Who in 1989, the magazine continued to be published, providing new adventures in the form of comics. In 1990 the magazine started appearing once every four weeks (13 times a year).

Panini years (1995–present) 

DWM is now published by Panini Comics, which purchased the title along with the rest of the Marvel UK catalogue in 1995. In 2006, however, it lost its exclusivity when BBC Worldwide launched its own comic, Doctor Who Adventures, aimed at a younger audience.

DWM's 400th issue was published in September 2008, and the publication celebrated its 30th anniversary in October 2009. In April 2010, it was confirmed in issue 420 that Doctor Who Magazine now holds the Guinness World Record for "Longest Running Magazine Based on a Television Series." The magazine reached its 500th issue in May 2016.

In April 2011, Panini Comics released a new monthly magazine titled Doctor Who Insider; although it was made in Britain the magazine was published for North America. It was announced on 27 January 2012 that Doctor Who Insider had ceased publication after nine issues. Doctor Who Insider returned for a special edition issue on 1 November 2012.

Panini has begun to digitally restore and reprint older DWM comics in trade paperback format. Twenty-five volumes have been printed so far: two featuring the comics adventures of the Fourth Doctor, one with the adventures of the Fifth Doctor, two featuring the Sixth Doctor, five with the adventures of the Seventh Doctor, four focusing on the Eighth Doctor, one with the adventures of the Ninth Doctor, three featuring the Tenth Doctor, four collecting the adventures of the Eleventh Doctor and four with the adventures of the Twelfth Doctor. Panini also published a one-shot magazine-format reprinting of the complete Ninth Doctor strips in 2006 and most of the Tenth Doctor and Martha Jones strips in 2008. DWM issue 426 reported that the series had been postponed; it eventually resumed with the publication of "The Crimson Hand" in May 2012.

In November 2020, Panini published The Daleks, a new compilation of the Dalek comic strips originally published on the back pages of early issues of 1960s comic TV Century 21. Unlike previous reprints, the majority of pages in the collection were scanned from the original artwork.

Editors 

DWMs founding editor was Dez Skinn, who had been headhunted by Stan Lee (the figurehead and creative leader at Marvel) to oversee the revitalisation of the ailing UK division. "[I] had the idea for a Doctor Who title around 1975. . . . I felt it would be a perfect stablemate to my then-current House of Hammer magazine, and could be produced in the same format, with a mix of comic strips and features, going behind and beyond the TV series." To make the publication work, Skinn needed a comic strip to be at the heart of the publication, and successfully negotiated for the rights to the Doctor Who comics licence with the BBC which had previously been held by Polystyle Publications since late 1964. DWCC Launching in 1979 as a weekly comic strip based publication, Skinn handed over the reins in 1980, and subsequent editors gradually realised then surpassed Skinn's vision of a more mature magazine, rejigging it to a monthly publication and getting rid of secondary and tertiary comic strips for regular features and articles going behind the scenes of the show.

During 1995 Panini bought out Marvel UK, and thus took control of DWM. The incumbent editor Gary Russell – who would go on the produce the Big Finish Productions Doctor Who audios dramas from their inception, and to work for BBC Wales as a Script Editor on the Doctor Who spin-offs The Sarah Jane Adventures and Torchwood – was 'asked to leave'. The editorship was taken over by recently hired comic strip editor, Gary Gillatt. Gillatt went on to edit the magazine for the next five years, except for issue 255 in 1997 which was guest-edited by one of the stars of the Doctor Who TV show Sophie Aldred (who had portrayed the Seventh Doctor's companion Ace during the late 1980s). In February 2001, the editor at the time Alan Barnes, oversaw the transformation of the comic strip from black and white to full-colour with the first episode of the Eighth Doctor story Ophidius (issue 300). Clayton Hickman became the editor in 2002, launching the deluxe triannual Special Editions of the magazine (which are running to this day) and the Doctor Who Annual, later Storybook, in 1996 (which ceased publication after five years). Subsequent editor Tom Spilsbury took over in 2007, later launching the deluxe triannual Bookazine (running parallel to the Special Editions, and again still being produced to this day). Spilsbury would stay at the helm for a decade, becoming the longest-serving editor in the process, handing over the editorship to current incumbent Marcus Hearn in 2017.

 Controversy 
The October 2017 issue of Doctor Who Magazine featured a hidden profane message in a column written by an anonymous writer under the pseudonym 'The Watcher'. Soon after the message's discovery, the column was amended in the digital version of the issue. It was later revealed that the writer of the column had been Nicholas Pegg, an occasional writer for the magazine and one of the Dalek operators on the television series. BBC Worldwide had told the Daily Mirror that "The matter was raised with the publisher who have dismissed the writer." Private Eye later reported that editor Tom Spilsbury's decision to leave the magazine stemmed from "falling-out" with BBC Wales over DWM's coverage of Doctor Who spin-off Class, and that he was "paid off" in the summer of 2017 to leave the publication. However, in the following issue of Private Eye, a letter from Spilsbury was published, denying these allegations.

 Circulation 

The magazine joined the Audit Bureau of Circulations in June 2010, giving the average figure per issue for every six months, meaning circulation figures have only been made available officially for six-monthly periods since August of that year, when the publication recorded an average circulation of 35,374 per issue for between January and June 2010.

Since then, the average figures per issue have fluctuated, reaching a high of 36,151 for the July–December 2013 period, but generally decreasing since then, with the occasional small rise.

The last-known six-month certified average circulation figure per issue was 20,635 for the period between July and December 2018. The magazine's average circulation figure per issue for January to June 2019 was due to be released on 15 August 2019 as part of the bureau's batch of Consumer Magazines figures for that period. However, for the first time since August 2010 no official data was published, after the magazine changed its reporting frequency to annually. The average circulation figure per issue for the 13 editions between January and December 2019, subsequently published by the bureau on 13 February 2020, was 17,586, comprising 10,239 paid single copies, 7,213 paid subscriptions and 134 free copies.

The average circulation per issue for the 13 editions between January and December 2020 was 16,304, according to data published by the bureau on 11 February 2021. It comprised 8,330 paid single copies, 7,838 paid subscriptions and 136 free copies.

The magazine stopped being registered with the Audit Bureau of Circulations at some point after then, meaning no figures for 2021 were published as part of the bureau's batch of Consumer Magazines figures that were released on 17 February 2022.

 Content 

Each issue of DWM contains a main comic strip (occasionally with secondary and tertiary strips or illustrated short stories), regular features (such as a letters page, previews and reviews of TV episodes, books and audios, and updates from the transmedia world of Doctor Who), and special articles (sometimes one-offs, sometimes in serial form, including interviews, analyses, and making-ofs).

 Comic strip 

DWM has featured an ongoing main comic strip starring the Doctor since its first issue in October 1979. The DWM strip thus took over from what has become known as the 'Polystyle era' (1964–1979) of Doctor Who comic strips. Paul Scoones, an historian of the Doctor Who comic strip, writes: 'First launched in the pages of TV Comic in November 1964, the comic strip version of Doctor Who is just one year younger than the television series on which it is based. The strip appeared almost every week: first in TV Comic, then in Countdown and TV Action before returning to TV Comic. All these titles were produced by a company called Polystyle Publications (formally TV Publications), which held the rights to publish a Doctor Who comic [strip] until May 1979 when the last instalment of the strip appeared [...] Once relinquished by Polystyle, the rights were soon snapped up by Marvel UK, who created their own ongoing comic [strip]. This new strip [...] continues to this day'. The main comic strip features the contemporary television Doctor (beginning with the Fourth Doctor who was on TV at the time DWM launched), sometimes with his on-screen companion(s), and sometimes with companion(s) created by the DWM writers. During some of the period when Doctor Who was off-air, in the wake of the Seventh Doctor, the DWM main strip featured stories with all the previous Doctors (1994–1996) but continued with the Eighth Doctor after the broadcast of the TV movie (1996). In 2004, when the series returned to television, showrunner Russell T Davies offered to let DWM write and publish the official regeneration scene from the Eighth Doctor to the Ninth Doctor. Although work was done on this storyline, then editor Clayton Hickman and writer Scott Gray eventually turned down the offer as they felt they couldn't do such an important event justice under the constraints imposed by the TV series' continuity. In October 2018 (issue 531), the main comic strip began featuring the Thirteenth Doctor in "The Warmonger".

As well as a main strip, DWM has also featured other comics strips over the years. In its first incarnation as Doctor Who Weekly the main strip was accompanied by a specially commissioned secondary strip exploring stories from across the Whoniverse, and a tertiary strip of reprints from other Marvel publications. The secondary strip continued with the transformation of the magazine into a monthly publication, finally ending in May 1982 (issue 64), albeit becoming more infrequent over the previous year. A tertiary strip, named 'Tales from the TARDIS', ran in Doctor Who Weekly until late April 1980 (issue 29). These re-used adaptations of classic works of literary science fiction previously published in Marvel Classics Comics (USA). In late May 1980 (issue 33), the tertiary strip returned reprinting the "Dalek Chronicles" (aka "Dalek Tapes"), a strip originally published as a one-pager in TV Century 21 as "The Daleks" (1965–1967). This tertiary Dalek strip ended in September 1982 (issue 68) after completing about half of the original run. Since 1982, other strips have appeared again from time to time. For instance, in the 1990s a Cyberman one-pager strip was featured on the inside cover (3 August 1994 – 8 May 1996 [issues 215–238]). Titled "The Cybermen", the series was set on their home planet of Mondas prior to the events of the television episode The Tenth Planet (1966). The TV Century 21 comic "The Daleks" was also resurrected for a short time in 1997 (12 March-30 July [issues 249–254]), drawn in the same style as the 1960s original and continuing the story from where it had left off by showing the Daleks attacking Earth. Other than this and since then, secondary and tertiary strips have been as rare as hen's teeth, and usually either one or two episodes.

The DWM comic strips were all originally printed in black and white (except with a minor – page-count-wise – exception for two pages of "The Tides of Time" [July 1982: issue 66]). The main strip, beginning in 1979 with the Fourth Doctor story "The Iron Legion" (17 October – 5 December [issues 1–8]), began being issued in colour as of issue 300 in 2001 with the Eighth Doctor story "Ophidius" (February–May [issues 300–303]). However, as early as December 1980 colourised reprints of the early Fourth Doctor main strip and secondary strips appeared in Marvel USA publications: Marvel Premiere: Doctor Who (every two months between December 1980 and June 1981 [issues 57–60]) successfully trialled the concept for an American audience to determine if it would attract enough readers; a Doctor Who comic series being launched in 1984. The series came to an end with issue 23 in August 1986, having colourised and reprinted all the Fourth Doctor strips and four of the six strips of the Fifth Doctor era, as well as 24 of the 27 DWM secondary strip stories originally published between 1979 and 1982. Reprints of the original DWM strips have also appeared in their original black and white as well as colourised in a dizzying number of formats, especially during the Marvel years (1979–1995). These Marvel UK (or Marvel licensed) parallel publications were: Doctor Who Magazine Specials (1980–1996); Doctor Who Magazine Graphic Novels (1989–1993); Doctor Who Classic Comics (1992–1994) and Doctor Who Yearbooks (1992–1996). Many of these publications also printed original strips as well. Another original Doctor Who strip also appeared in The Incredible Hulk Presents comic series (1989), and the Doctor appeared as a guest character in the first Death's Head series (1989; rejigged and reprinted as "Incomplete Death's Head" in 1993). Spin-off strips and reprints have become much more limited and much more focused during the Panini Years (1995–present). There was a short-lived original Eighth Doctor strip for the Radio Times (1996–1997), some original Ninth and Tenth Doctor strips in the Annual and Storybooks (2006–2010), and two sets of reprints of the Ninth Doctor strips (2006) and some of the Tenth Doctor strips (2008) in the relaunched and rebranded Special Editions (2002–present). Returning to the origins of the DWM main strip, Panini licensed IDW, an American comic book company, for new digitalised colour reprints of Fourth, Fifth, Sixth, and Seventh Doctor stories. Beginning in January 2008 and running into 2013, IDW printed its Doctor Who Classics monthly comic book series, going on to collect the colourised strips into various trade paperbacks and omnibus editions.

Notable writers and artists who have worked on the DWM comic strips, in all its myriad forms include John Wagner, Pat Mills, Alan Moore, Grant Morrison, Dave Gibbons, Mike McMahon, John Ridgway and Ian Edginton. Supporting characters created by such writers for DWM have even crossed over from the comic to other spin-off media include Frobisher, the shape-changing companion of the Sixth and Seventh Doctors who would appear in Big Finish audios; Abslom Daak, the Dalek Killer; the Special Executive, who would later appear in Marvel's Captain Britain; and the villainous Beep the Meep.

During the mid-2000s, in the wake of the successful return of Doctor Who to television, the BBC began offering multiple comic strip publishing licences effectively ending the monopoly held by DWM since they had taken over where Polystyle had left off. In 2006, the partwork publishers GE Fabbri acquired the license to produce Doctor Who – Battles in Time, a fortnightly magazine with a trading card game and its own Doctor Who comic strip. The final issue (number 70) was released on 13 May 2009. Around the same time, IMC launched Doctor Who Adventures, its comic strip and features aimed at 6 to 13-year-olds, a younger demographic than the DWM readership. Initially published every fortnight, from 2008 it went weekly, returning to fortnightly in May 2013, then monthly in 2014. In April 2015, the title was purchased by Panini, the publishers of DWM, who rebooted the publication beginning again with issue 1, changing it to bi-monthly in late 2016. On 19 June 2017, Panini confirmed that publication of the magazine was to be paused after issue 24. A special one-off edition was released in January 2019. Finally, IDW – who were reprinting early DWM strips in their Doctor Who Classics series – launched a parallel range of ongoing comics featuring the Tenth Doctor in early 2008. Over the next six years, until the end of 2013, there were series and ones-shots featuring the Tenth then Eleventh Doctor, even producing a cross over with "Star Trek: The Next Generation / Doctor Who : Assimilation2". IDW ceded their license to Titan in 2014, who have since created a complex number of parallel Doctor Who series for both nu-Who and classic Doctors. Titan have collected the IDW and Titan comics into various format collectors editions, scaling back production since the beginning of the Thirteenth Doctor era.

Despite the competition of Battles in Time, Doctor Who Adventures, and the IDW/Titan series, DWM and its main comic strip has continued unabated. A sign of its rude health is that Panini continue to publish the ongoing Doctor Who Comic Strip Collected Editions which began in 2004. Over the subsequent years the Collected Editions have reprinted all the Doctor Who main strips in their original size (A4) and format (i.e., black and white for DWM issues 1–299), as well as many secondary, tertiary, and parallel publication strips. As of December 2019 there have been 29 volumes released, with the first Thirteenth Doctor Collected Edition (volume 30) due in 2020.

 Cartoons and illustrated short stories 

The publication also features parody cartoons, most notably "Doctor Who?", a humorous look at the series by Tim Quinn and Dicky Howett. This was principally a three-panel comic strip, though occasionally page-long parodies were featured. Also, between 1989 and 1992 "The Comic Assassins" was a series of parody strips by Steve Noble and Kev F. Sutherland. "Doctor Who?"'s spiritual successor was the single-panel strip "Doctor Whoah!" by 'Baxter'. Embedded into the 'Galaxy Forum' letters page, it lampooned a recent episode, DVD release of stories or other such event by showing alternative, exaggerated and expanded versions of Doctor Who scenes. For example, after the broadcast of "Partners in Crime" (2008), the strip portrayed the Doctor's arrival on the 'Planet of the Hats', referred to in the episode. The strip was known for its characters who are depicted as having no pupils in their eyes. Since 2014, "Doctor Whoah!" has been replaced by "The Daft Dimension", a similarly sized strip in three panels by Lew Stringer.

DWM has also published illustrated short stories in its magazine and parallel publications, most cohesively during the Marvel years. Beginning in Doctor Who Weekly on 9 April 1980 (issue 26), a sequence of these short stories ran for eight issues, returning is shorts burst for a number of issues every few years up until 1996. Occasional illustrated short stories have appeared since then, including the many parallel publications in both Marvel and Panini years. In addition, there was also a run of 'Brief Encounters', very short one or two-page illustrated stories that ran from 28 November 1990 (issue 167) through to 6 July 1994 (issue 214) as well as in contemporary "Specials" and "Yearbooks" between 1991 and 1992.

 Regular features and special articles 
Other regular features of the magazine include the news section "Gallifrey Guardian", which has run since nearly the beginning of the magazine; the letters page "Galaxy Forum" which – as well as containing the "Daft Dimension" strip – features other small sub-sections, such as "Ask DWM!" (where readers' questions about the show are answered), "On This Month" (which looks at an old issue on the anniversary of its publication) and "WhoTube" (which highlights "Doctor Who"-themed videos which can be viewed online); reviews of television episodes and merchandise (in "The DWM Review", known for a time as "After Image", "Off the Shelf", and "Shelf Life"); the "Time Team", which involves four fans watching every Doctor Who story in order from the beginning; and, since production restarted on the series in 2004, a regular column "Production Notes" by the show's executive producer. From 2004 to 2009 the column was written by Russell T Davies, and from January 2010 to July 2017, Steven Moffat took over the page, although other writers and production staff have from time-to-time written the column. Also, on the final page of magazine, there is a section called "Wotcha!" (compiled by 'The Watcher'), a comedy page with such recurring features as, 'A History of Doctor Who in 100 Objects', 'Supporting Artist of the Month', a spoof 'Top Ten', the 'Stockbridge English Dictionary' (a variation on a game from I'm Sorry I Haven't a Clue) and a true or false quiz "The Six Faces of Delusion". Prior to this, the slot was taken up by a page called "Who on Earth is...", featuring a short interview with someone previously (or currently) involved in Doctor Who (say, a member of the cast).

A single-page 'opinion' column has often been part of the magazine's mix – past columns have included "Fluid Links" by Matt Jones, "The Life and Times of Jackie Jenkins" by 'Jackie Jenkins', "It's the End... But" by 'The Watcher', "You Are Not Alone" by Jonathan Morris (as 'Neil Harris') and "Relative Dimensions" by author (and former "Time Team" member) Jacqueline Rayner. The format has changed over the years, but the news, letters, reviews, and comic strip have all been present consistently since the early 1980s.

The magazine also features interviews with the cast and crew of the television show (including the old episodes), and reports from the set of the current series, written by Benjamin Cook or Jason Arnopp. The behind-the-scenes stories of all of the 1963–1989 episodes have been documented in Andrew Pixley's "DWM Archive", and detailed analysis of certain significant serials are covered in "The Fact of Fiction", usually written by former DWM editor Alan Barnes, Jonathan Morris or David Bailey. "The DWM Review" is currently written predominantly by Graham Kibble-White, former editor Gary Gillatt, Paul Kirkley, Martin Ruddock and Matt Michael. Previous reviewers include Vanessa Bishop, Craig Hinton (died in 2006), and Gary Russell, who subsequently became the magazine's editor.

 DWM Parallel Publications: Marvel Years (1979–1995) 

During the Marvel years (1979–1995), Doctor Who Magazine produced three types of "Deluxe edition" series issued in parallel to the main publication. These were the semi-regular Specials generally issued twice a year seasonally, and most usually labelled "Summer" and "Winter" (1980–1996); Yearbooks, essentially annuals, issued once a year in advance and for Christmas (1992–1996); and Poster Magazines, a short run of more visually orientated periodicals with single themes (1994–1996). All these series came to an end in the wake of Panini acquiring Marvel, and consequently, Doctor Who Magazine in 1995.

In addition, and since its very beginning, DWM comic strips have been reprinted and – on a few occasions had their original release – in many other publications and formats. Reprinting of DWM strips began as early as 1980 in parallel serial publications, and over the years there have been a number of such comic reprints and collections, many of which colourised the original strips. In addition, there have also been some original strips issued through these publications. Some series have even reprinted some of the earlier pre-DWM Polystyle Publications Doctor Who comic strips that appeared in TV Comic, which began in 1964 and ended when DWM gained the comic strip licence in 1979. There have also been original Doctor Who strips in other Marvel publications, and the Doctor appearing in other original Marvel strips (all of which dovetail with the main DWM strip). Finally, other publishers have reprinted DWM strips under licence.

 Doctor Who Comics USA (1980–1986) 
The first series of reprints of DWM comic strips began in late 1980, only a year or so after the original publication in 1979. These reprints were for the American market, and consisted of four issues in the Marvel Premiere series. The Marvel Premiere series was considered a testing ground to determine if a character or concept could attract enough readers to justify launching their own series. The four issues were considered a success, and so eventually became a series beginning in 1984, titled simply Doctor Who. Again, these were reprints were from DWM, and began soon after where Marvel Premiere left off (skipping a two part strip, perhaps appropriately titled "Timeslip" [issues 17–18], a Fourth Doctor story featuring the First, Second, and Third Doctors; this was eventually published in Doctor Who issue 18). All these strip reprints were colourised for the first time; as were supporting secondary Doctorless strips also taken from DWM (or, on limited occasions, DWM Specials). Both Marvel Premiere: Doctor Who and Doctor Who had regular features and special articles.

 Marvel Premiere: Doctor Who (Issues 57–60): From December 1980 to June 1981 once every two months, Marvel USA experimented with the DWM Doctor Who comic strip for an American audience. For four issues they reprinted the earliest two Fourth Doctor main strips. These were now colourised, and with new covers displaying the Doctor Who logo of the time. These four issues of Marvel Premiere: Doctor Who were a test run for an American style Doctor Who comic, which eventually began publishing in 1984. In some editions there were just strips (with the exception of a letters page); in some editions there were also short features. Furthermore, in two editions there were secondary strips, in one instance a DWM secondary strip, and in the other a non-Doctor Who strip – both of which were in colour.
 Doctor Who (Marvel Comics USA) (Issues 1–23): From October 1984 to August 1986, and following the success of the trial run of Marvel Premiere: Doctor Who, Marvel Comics published a monthly comic book series in America titled simply Doctor Who, that reprinted the Fourth Doctor and some of the earliest Fifth Doctor main strips. Beginning soon after where Marvel Premiere: Doctor Who had concluded (skipping the third story of the original run, which was eventually published later in the run), once again the strips were colourised and had new covers, but they also appeared in a 'glossy format' rather than traditional American style rough paper print. There were also DWM secondary strips (again, colourised from the original black and white); or on limited occasions strips taken from early DWM Specials. The comic had regular features, from issue three a letters column and, from issue 13, "Who Knows", described as 'Happenings in the world of Doctor Who. There were also occasional short special articles on the television show, such as overviews of characters, and interviews with cast and crew members.

The list below covers all comic strip colourised reprints and notable special articles:

Doctor Who (Marvel USA) ceased publication with issue 23 in August 1986. Editor Jim Salicrup explained the reason as being 'poor sales. Despite a good start, and rather good sales in areas where Doctor Who (the television programme) is in syndication, sales have been off. Producing Doctor Who [Marvel USA] in this format has been expensive, and without sufficient sales support it was decided to discontinue [...] rather than sacrifice the quality of the magazine'. Salicrup is essentially referring to the added costs of the glossy paper and the strips needing to go through a process of colouration.

In summary, over the entire run of Marvel Premiere: Doctor Who and Doctor Who the magazine reprinted in colourised form:
 the DWM main comic strip from issue 1 (17 October 1979) through to 77 (June 1983) in consecutive order, with the exception of "Timeslip" (DWM issues 17–18) which was initially skipped but included much later in the run essentially as a Doctor Who (Marvel USA) secondary strip. Thus, the magazine included all the Fourth Doctor strips, and the first four (of a total of six) Fifth Doctor strips.
 the DWM Doctorless secondary strip, mostly in order from the beginning of Doctor Who (Marvel USA) – except for a one part story in Marvel Premiere: Doctor Who – up until issue 13, when "Abslom Daak… Dalek-Killer" was followed by later strips featuring the character. After that, secondary strips were placed increasingly randomly. Over the entire original run of 27 secondary strips in DWM (from issue 1 to 64, after which they came to an end as a continuous feature), Marvel USA comics reprinted 24 of these. The exceptions were the one-part stories: "Star Death" (DWM #47), "4-D War" (DWM #51), and "Black Sun Rising" (DWM #57).
 three Doctorless strips from early DWM Specials (not including a parody strip from DWM Winter Special 1983/84 [1983]). One from the DWM Winter Special 1981 (the second part of story began in DWM); and two from the DWM Special Summer 1982. The Doctor Who Magazine Specials are listed in full in the next subsection.

 Doctor Who Magazine Specials (1980–1996) 

From 1980 to 1996 DWM released a series of 'Specials' with an increased page count. Early on, the Specials tended to have a mix of articles and comic strips (both reprints and originals). However, after the first few issues and up to about halfway through the run, the publication tended to be just composed of articles; with the occasional issue dedicated to comic strip reprints, essentially a 'Graphic Novel' (some in the original black & white, some colourised). The second half of the run went back to including a comic strip in article based issues, during which time there were also two 'Graphic Novels' (both in colour, one reprints, one original). Occasionally, issues carried illustrated short stories. The Specials began by being published twice a year during the summer and winter, and were usually, although not always, branded as such. This changed over the period 1987–1989 when there was only one a year (two for anniversaries), and then none in 1990. The twice year schedule resumed in 1991 again with summer and winter editions, before becoming a little more erratic during and after 1994 to the end of the run. The final two issues were devoted to Doctor Who movies: *"Dr. Who and the Daleks" and "Daleks – Invasion Earth: 2150 A.D." (issue 29) and Doctor Who: The Movie (issue 30).

These Specials were not numbered, and sometimes contained no indicia or did not specify their status in the indicia – accordingly, confusion has arisen over the years between the Specials and some one-off DWM comic strip publications from the same period (some named Graphic Novels in their indicia, some with no indicia, or just the title of the publication in the indicia). However, in 2016 DWM provided a pictorial overview of what they considered official DWM Specials in their Doctor Who Magazine: 500 DWM Issues bonus 'Souvenir' publication that came free with DWM issue 500. The list below follows the overview therein, but the issue numbering is imposed for ease of tracking, and was never included in the actual publications. The table below also attempts to capture the flavour of the different types of issue with the labelling 'Seasonal Specials', 'Graphic Novels', 'Anniversary Issues', and 'Movie Specials'. In some cases, however, a single Special can be more than one of these types (such as labelled a seasonal special and an anniversary issue); once again, the numbering is imposed on these issues for ease of tracking the type.Seasonal Specials [SS] (which predominated): most usually twice a year for Winter and Summer, and labelled as such. The covers only rarely indicated the year.Graphic Novels [GN] (occasional): around half of all the Specials had comic strips, but six were devoted entirely to, or substantially to, comic strips. Note, the numbering here tracks all Marvel era Doctor Who Graphic Novels across its many different publications (for the full overview see the 'Doctor Who Magazine Graphic Novels (1989–1993)' subsection below).Anniversary Issues [A] (three editions): for the 25th Anniversary of the television series (November 1988); the 10th Anniversary of Doctor Who Magazine (October 1989); and finally the 30th Anniversary of the television series (November 1993) which was also labelled (unlike the other anniversary editions) a seasonal special for Winter 1993.Movie Specials [M] (the final two editions): "The Sixties Dalek Movies" (also labelled "Spring Special") (February 1996); and "The Doctor Who Movie Special" (May 1996) celebrating the return of Doctor Who to the screen after seven years without any television presence.

Doctor Who Magazine Specials ceased publication, along with all the other Marvel parallel publications, with the purchase of Doctor Who Magazine by Panini in 1995. Six years later, Panini kicked off production of 'Specials' once again, this time called 'Special Editions' (2002–present), following very similar formats and mixture of types although issued triannually. Panini would go on to launch another set of triannual 'Specials', known as 'Bookazines', a decade or so after that (2013–present).

With respect to Specials devoted to comic strips and labelled as 'Graphic Novels' in the list above, there were six issued in total. Along with the three Marvel era 'Graphic Novels' (1989–1993) and the DWM Classic Comics Autumn Special: Evening’s Empire (1993) publication (which appears as a Special of the 'Classic Comics' run) there were ten Marvel era DWM 'Graphic Novels' overall. These are all listed together for ease in the Doctor Who Magazine Graphic Novels (1989–1993)' subsection below, with the publications belonging to the different 'Specials' and 'Classic Comics' indicated in the table.

 Doctor Who Graphic Novels (1980–1994) 

There were ten publications during the Marvel era that can be considered 'Graphic Novels'. These were six of the 30 Doctor Who Magazine 'Specials' (1980–1996), Evening’s Empire (1993) which appeared as a 'Special' of the 'Classic Comics' run (1992–1994), and three one-off publications. The term 'Graphic Novel' must be applied loosely here overall, as all but two these publications collect and reprint several comic stories from DWM, although in most cases the stories are related. Furthermore, the two issues that print original stories in full or part are The Age of Chaos (1994) in the 'Specials' run; and the aforementioned Classic Comics Autumn Special: Evening’s Empire (1993), which printed a strip begun but never completed in Doctor Who Magazine. Accordingly, the three one-off 'Graphic Novels' are all reprints from DWM, although two of these colourise original black and white strips:

 Doctor Who: Voyager (1989): Collects and reprints four Sixth Doctor stories from the DWM main comic strip, including the two stories already reprinted in Doctor Who Collected Comics (DWM 'Specials') three years previous. These appeared in the order of original publication, and all four strips were colourised for the first time.
 Abslom Daak Dalek Killer (1990): Abslom Daak was a character who first appeared in a DWM secondary strip in the early years of the publication, when still Doctor Who Weekly (1980). The character returned a couple of times in two related secondary strips later that year, before appearing in the main strip alongside the Seventh Doctor after almost a decade (1989). This volume collects all these stories, as well as having an original short story linking the early three secondary strips with the later main strip appearance. The strips appear here, as they did in their original publication, in black and white.
 Doctor Who: The Mark of Mandragora (1993): A Virgin Publishing experiment, who were at the time printing the Virgin New Adventures Doctor Who novels (1991–1997) starring the Seventh Doctor. Virgin licensed some Seventh Doctor main comic strips from DWM and published them in a graphic novel entitled Doctor Who: Mark of Mandragora, reprinting stories that originally appeared between 1990 and 1991, as well as the text story "Teenage Kicks" by Paul Cornell (1990). The strips were colourised.

The list below displays all ten 'Graphic Novels', although only the contents of the three stand-alone publications are given here. The seven other publications refer back to the content lists of the sub-sections for Doctor Who Magazine 'Specials' (1980–1996) and Doctor Who Classic Comics (Marvel) (1992–1994). This method has been chosen to both give a full overview of the ten DWM 'Graphic Novels' in this section, but also so as to differentiate with those that are part of other series. Numbering has been provided to give some order to these publications (and is reflected in the 'Specials' and Classic Comics sections), but is not official and does not indicate any 'series' designation.

{|class="wikitable collapsible collapsed" style="border:none"
|-
!scope="col"|List of Doctor Who Graphic Novels
|-
|style="padding:0;border:none"|
{| class="wikitable"
|-
|MGN# || Series || Title ||Date || Pages || Contents || References|-

| GN-01 || Specials [issue 01] || Summer Special [1980] || Summer 1980 || 52 
| 
See Doctor Who Magazine Specials (1980–1996)' sub-section above.
| DWMS
|-

| GN-02 || Specials [issue 06] || Summer Special [1983] || Summer 1983 || 48 
| 
See Doctor Who Magazine Specials (1980–1996)' sub-section above.
| DWMS
|-

| GN-03 || Specials [issue 10] || 1985 Summer Special Classic || Summer 1985 || 52 
| 
See Doctor Who Magazine Specials (1980–1996)' sub-section above.
| DWMS
|-

| GN-04 || Specials [issue 13] || Doctor Who Collected Comics || 1986 || 44
|
See Doctor Who Magazine Specials (1980–1996)' sub-section above.
| DWMS
|-

| GN-05 || One-off Graphic Novel #1 || Doctor Who: Voyager  || May 1989 || 104 
| Comics strips (colourised reprints):
"The Shape Shifter" [6D] [issues 88–89; May–June 1984]
"Voyager" [6D] [issues 90–94; July–November 1984]
"Polly the Glot" [6D] [issues 95–97; December 1984 – February 1985]
"Once Upon a Time Lord" [6D] [issues 98–99; March–April 1985]
| DWMGN
|-

| GN-06 || One-off Graphic Novel #2 || Abslom Daak Dalek Killer  || April 1990 || 100 
|Comics strips (reprints in original black and white):
"Abslom Daak… Dalek Killer" [Doctorless secondary strip] [issues 17–20; 6–27 February 1980]
"Star Tigers" [I&II] [Doctorless secondary strips] [issues 27–30 / 44–46; 16 April-7 May 1980 / September–November 1980]
"Nemesis of the Daleks" [7D] [issues 152–155; September–December 1989]Short story (original):
"Between the Wars: A Slow Night in Paradise" (fills narrative gap between "Star Tigers" and "Nemesis of the Daleks")
| DWMGN
|-

| GN-07 || One-off Graphic Novel #3 || Doctor Who: The Mark of Mandragora || April 1993 || 94 
| Comic strips (colourised reprints):
"Train-Flight" [7D] [issues 159–161; April–June 1990]
"Doctor Conkerer!" [7D] [issue 162; July 1990]
"Fellow Travellers" [7D] [issues 164–166; 8 September-31 October 1990]
"Darkness, Falling" ("The Mark of Mandragora" prequel I) [Doctorless main strip] [issue 167; 28 November 1990]
"Distractions" ("The Mark of Mandragora" prequel II) [7D] [issue 168; 26 December 1990]
"The Mark of Mandragora" [7D] [issues 169–172; 23 January-17 April 1991]Short story (reprint):
"Teenage Kicks" [7D] [issue 163; August 1990] (printed between "Fellow Travellers" and "Darkness, Falling") 
| DWMGN
|-

| GN-08 || Doctor Who Classic Comics [Autumn Special] || Evening's Empire || September 1993 || 52 
| 
See Doctor Who Classic Comics (Marvel) (1992–1994)' sub-section below.
| DWCCS
|-

| GN-09 || Specials [issue 25] || The Dalek Chronicles || August 1994 || 108 
| 
See Doctor Who Magazine Specials (1980–1996)' sub-section above.
| DWMS
|-

| GN-10 || Specials [issue 28] || The Age of Chaos || October 1994 || 92 
| 
See Doctor Who Magazine Specials (1980–1996)' sub-section above.
| DWMS
|-

| colspan="8" style="text-align:left; font-size:10pt;"| Notes

 a  Doctor Who: Voyager is named a 'Graphic Novel' both on its cover and in its indicia. It is worth noting that in a response to a letter to Doctor Who Classic Comics (issue 4) in 1993, the designation is a 'one-off', as is the title Doctor Who Collected Comics (GN-04, directly above). Specials status and date for the latter publication is confirmed in Doctor Who Magazine: 500 DWM Issues bonus 'Souvenir' publication (free with DWM issue 500) (2016). The inference here is that the inclusion of publications like Doctor Who Magazine Collected Comics in 'Souvenir' is somewhat arbitrary. However, this is the situation, and Doctor Who: Voyager does not appear in the Specials list. Indeed, as Doctor Who comic strip historian John Ainsworth notes Doctor Who: Voyager is considered the first proper 'Graphic Novel' by DWM and Marvel.
 b  Abslom Daak Dalek Killer, although only having its title on the cover and in the indicia with no format mentioned, is designated a 'Graphic Album' in advertising. See, for instance, the advert in the Doctor Who Magazine Summer Special [1991].
 c  Doctor Who: The Mark of Mandragora is named a 'Graphic Novel' on its cover but not in its indicia, where the Virgin licensing mentions only Marvel and not Doctor Who Magazine. Neither is DWM mentioned on the credits page, however, the back cover blurb does indeed cite the source material.

|}
|}

After Marvel sold Doctor Who Magazine to Panini in 1995, the different formats of Graphic Novels would become much more harmonized with the introduction of the Doctor Who Comic Strip Collected Editions (2004–present)'. These would reprint DWM main strips and strips from parallel publications in large A4 editions. The ethos of the 'Collected Editions' was and is to print the stories in their original order and format, in other words, reprinting strips originally produced in black and white as black and white. Accordingly, the Marvel era publications with reprinted but colourised strips generally remains the only way to see these stories in Graphic Novel format. There are exceptions, however. Colourised reprints of the early DWM black and white strips which had been published in Doctor Who Marvel Comics USA (1980–1986) would appear in Doctor Who Classic Comics (1992–1994), around the same time as the Marvel Graphic Novels. Then, in January 2008 under a Panini licence, IDW Publishing, an American comic book company, would launch Doctor Who Classics, a monthly comic book series reprinting digitally colourised Fourth, Fifth, Sixth and Seventh Doctor strips (2008–2014). The series would go on to be collected in various trade paperbacks, and then some in omnibus editions – both of which can be considered 'Graphic Novels'. However, these are recoloured digitally while the Marvel era were hand-coloured, so the Marvel Graphic Novels retain a certain uniqueness. From later years of DWM when the strip was colourised (beginning issue 300 in 2001), there were also two Panini era 'Special Editions' (2002–present) that reprinted comic strips for the Ninth Doctor (April 2006) and some of the mid-period Tenth Doctor (April 2008), although these strips went on to also be collected in the 'Collected Editions'.

 DWM related Doctor Who strips (1989–1993) 

During the late 1980s Marvel UK Comics decided to expand its ranges, and created a number of 'experimental' comics. Two of these titles launched toward the end of 1989, both of which were edited by Andy Seddon, featured Doctor Who content. The Incredible Hulk Presents had an original dedicated stand-alone Doctor Who comic strip which ran every issue, alongside reprints of other Marvel USA comic strips. The Death's Head situation was far more complex as it was constituted as crossover stories. The already established character of Death's Head featured in a main strip of Doctor Who Magazine, before going on to have its own comic Deaths Head launched where the Doctor went on to appear in one of the stories. Subsequently, Death's Head would return to have another guest appearance in the Doctor Who Magazine main strip. Both publications suffered poor sales, and were soon cancelled. However, in 1993, all the Death's Head stories, plus those from DWM featuring Death's Head now specially colourised, were reissued in the pre-planned limited run The Incomplete Death's Head series. The content also included a non-Death's Head Doctor Who Magazine story (again specially colourised), as well as a newly created coda starring the Doctor in the final pages of the final issue.

 The Incredible Hulk Presents (1989) The Incredible Hulk Presents was a short-lived weekly comic from Marvel UK. It launched in September 1989 with issue 1, and lasted twelve issues in total. It reprinted stories from US Marvel Comics' The Incredible Hulk from the 1970s; G.I. Joe: Special Missions (retitled for the UK as Action Force, later G.I. Joe the Action Force); and an Indiana Jones strip reprinting Marvel US adaptations of Indiana Jones and the Last Crusade and further Indiana Jones adventures. All the reprinted US strips were in colour. The only original content was the Doctor Who strip, which was, however, produced in black and white. This strip featured ten adeventures (with two two-parters) of the Seventh Doctor.

The 'intention (unbeknownst to the editor of Doctor Who Magazine) [was] that the strips would also run in DWM. When he found out, John Freeman took issue with the plan, arguing that while the strips had merit for the intended younger audience IHP was aimed at, they were inappropriate for DWM, which was trying to tailor more for Doctor Who fans, instead of the mainstream audience previous editors had aimed for'. Freeman's argument was eventually accepted by Marvel UK as sales figures of DWM improved under his leadership; albeit with two exceptions. The two part strip "Hunger at the Ends of Time!" from issues 2 and 3 of IHP was reprinted in DWM issues 157 and 158 (February – March, 1990); and the one unpublished strip completed for IHP issue 13 before the publication was cancelled, "Doctor Conkerer!", which appeared in DWM issue 162 (July 1990).

Andy Seddon, editor of IHP, says that the comic folded quite quickly as 'a result of poor sales. I think everyone involved at the editorial level didn't think it was a coherent offering'. As well as the reprint and re-purposing of the two strips mentioned above, four of the strips were soon reprinted in Doctor Who Classic Comics (1992–1994) – beginning with issue 21 (June 1992) – now specially colourised (see below). Eventually, all the strips (including the re-purposed IHP issue 13 strip printed in DWM 162) were reissued in original black and white in the Collected Edition Doctor Who: Nemesis of the Daleks (2013).

 Death's Head & Incomplete Death's Head (1989–1993) 

The character of Death's Head was a giant robotic bounty hunter created by writer Simon Furman for the Marvel UK's The Transformers comic. According to Furman, Death's Head was simply a 'throwaway character' which would 'be discarded down the line (probably at the end of the first story arc)'. However, when artist Geoff Senior showed Furman the initial character designs, both agreed Death's Head had potential beyond his planned transitory appearance. To avoid Hasbro claiming ownership of the character as a consequence of the Transformers copyright terms agreed with Marvel, Death's Head had to make his debut in another Marvel comic before appearing in Transformers. Accordingly, Furman wrote a single-page "Death's Head" strip that has become known as "High Noon Tex", illustrated by Bryan Hitch). In this short strip, Death's Head was a noir-ish contract killer of human proportions (thus anticipating the character's size and occupation post-Transformers appearances). The idea was that the strip would be published in a number of Marvel UK titles prior to appearing in The Transformers – although there is no evidence of any such an early publication. Death's Head made his debut as the giant robotic bounty hunter in the weekly The Transformers comic beginning with issue 113 (16 May 1987), and appearing during this initial run in 13 issues in total: #114, #117-#119, #133-#134, and #146-#151 (ending 6 February 1988).

First Doctor Who crossover: Doctor Who Magazine – The character's first association with Doctor Who happened in the April 1998 edition of Doctor Who Magazine (issue 135) in the Seventh Doctor main strip "The Crossroads of Time". In this story the Doctor and Death's Head clashed, the former reducing the latter from a giant robot to human size with 'one of the Master's Tissue Compression Eliminators!,' before sending him to Earth.

Death's Head then made a guest appearance in Marvel UK's Dragon's Claws issue 5 (November 1988) in a strip titled "Watch Out Dragon's Claws – Here's Death's Head". After these guest appearances, Marvel Comics UK launched the full colour USA size-format Death's Head in December 1988. The publication was issued monthly, with each edition featuring one long comic strip story starring Death's Head.

Second Doctor Who crossover: Death's Head – It was during the Death's Head comic run that the Seventh Doctor appeared as a central antagonist. In issue 8 (July 1989), the story "Time Bomb!" (not to be confused with a DWM Sixth Doctor story of the same name) saw the Doctor with a bounty on his head. Death's Head picks up the contract from a long term Doctor Who Magazine character and adversary to the Doctor, uber-capitalist Josiah W. Dogbolter.

Despite the first issue of Death's Head comic prompting a letter from Stan Lee praising the character and creative team, the publication soon folded. This was reported to be a consequence of distribution problems and the comic being of a smaller size causing it to be obscured by larger comics on the shelf. The Death's Head publication was cancelled at issue 10 (September 1989). The following year, Death's Head returned in the Fantastic Four comic (issue 338; March 1990), with a story titled "Kangs for the Memories!!! Or Guess Who's Coming to Diner". Later the same year Death's Head featured in an ongoing story called "The Body in Question" in Marvel's short lived Strip comic. Beginning in issue 13 (August 1990) and ending in the final issue of the publication (November 1990) the story was later republished as a Death's Head graphic novel Death's Head: The Body in Question (1991). This strip not only resolved the cliffhanger at the end of the cancelled Death's Head series, but also outlined an origin story (although confusingly, perhaps, Death's Head was human sized prior to his confrontation with the Doctor). Death's Head then popped up in The Sensational She-Hulk (issue 24; February 1991) with the story "Priceless", and in a short stand-alone strip in Marvel Comics Presents (issue 76; March 1991) with "The Deadliest Game".

Third Doctor Who crossover: Doctor Who Magazine – In May 1991, Death's Head featured in a cameo role in the Doctor Who Magazine main strip in a story called "Party Animals" (issue 173). In the story, the Seventh Doctor attends a party populated by a number of his foes, and witnesses a bar fight explode, in which Death's Head plays a contributing factor.

This was essentially the end of original stories in Death's Head initial run. However, the character was rebooted as Death's Head II for inclusion in Marvel UK's next wave of titles. Commissioned by the new editor Paul Neary, Death's Head II replaced the original character with a new version created by Dan Abnett, Andy Lanning, and Liam Sharp. In an autumn 1992 interview with Comic World, Neary was dismissive about the original character, saying 'I didn't think there was much future in Transformers-style robots and I thought we could do an awful lot better." He produced some sample sketches of how he wanted the character to look, and Liam Sharp's demo artwork gave the project 'a kickstart'. Death's Head II launched with issue 1 in March 1992, and ran for four monthly issues.

Fourth Doctor Who crossover: The Incomplete Death's Head – Death's Head II was an immediate success, which meant Neary was ordered to create more titles. The simplest way to do this quickly was to reprint the original Death's Head comic series. The job was given to editor John Freeman. 'Paul was ordered to come up with more Death's Head titles,' said Freeman 'and the easiest way to do that was to reprint the original series. That didn't mean he liked it... I suggested the "wraparound story" featuring DHII to help convince him'. The series – which ran for twelve issues – was called The Incomplete Death's Head (January – December 1993). However, it did not only repeat the original series, but also included a number of other Death's Head strips from Marvel publications, pretty much in order of release, the exception being The Transformers stories and The Body in Question series. Accordingly, the twelve issues of The Incomplete Death's Head included everything else from "High Noon Tex" through to the Marvel Comics Presents story "The Deadliest Game", as well as beginning (issue 1) and ending (issue 12) with the two Doctor Who Magazine strips "The Crossroads of Time" and "Party Animals" – now colourised from their original black and white. Strangely, the publication also incorporated a non-Death's Head story early-run (issues 4 and 5), the Doctor Who Magazine comic strip "Keepsake" (DWM 140; September 1988) once again starring the Seventh Doctor, and once again colourised. This was possible due to way the whole series was framed with the wraparounds, with Death's Head II witnessing these past events in an effort to learn more about his original incarnation. In this way, the Doctor's status of arch-nemesis of the original Death's Head is heightened even before "Time Bomb" appears in issue 9 – the only original Death's Head series strip featuring the Doctor. Indeed, the final few pages of the final issue – as an untitled coda – have a fourth encounter with the Doctor, specially produced for the publication.

In summary, all of the Doctor Who and Death's Head material is included in The Incomplete Death's Head series and subsequent graphic novel in colourised form. However, as of 2020, the Death's Head / Incomplete Death's Head comic strip of "Time Bomb!" and the Untitled coda comic strip of Incomplete Death's Head has yet to be reprinted in the DWM Collected Editions series. The original DWM strips have all been repetrinted – in their original black and white and not their Incomplete Death's Head colourised form – in A Cold Day in Hell (2009) ("The Crossroads of Time" & "Keepsake") and The Good Soldier (2015) ("Party Animals").

The Death's Head character, post Doctor Who crossover, would go on to have numerous further adventures continuing as Death's Head II and then as a third incarnation, Death's Head 3.0, once again created by original Death's Head writer Simon Furman.

 Doctor Who Classic Comics (1992–1994) 

Between 1992 and 1994, Marvel UK published Doctor Who Classic Comics. The aim was, as editor Gary Russell stated in the Editorial of the first issue, 'to reproduce every one of the Doctor Who strips produced in Britain'. In the end, the publication only ran for 27 monthly issues, with an additional mid-run 'Autumn Special' in 1993. Over the 27 issues, the publication reprinted strips predominately from the early Polystyle Doctor Who comic strip and the early TV Century 21 Dalek comic strip, but also from a number of sources including, later in the run, DWM itself. As well as reprints, the 'Autumn Special' featured the comic strip "Evening's Empire", an unfinished story from DWM issue 180, here completed for the first time. "Evening's Empire", accordingly, can be seen as a 'Graphic Novel' and essentially as the only original strip of the publication. The sources were:Polystyle comic strip (1964–1979): reprinting selected stories from the First, Second, Third, and Fourth Doctors originally printed in TV Comic (#674–999 [1964–1971]); Countdown (#1–39 [1971]); Countdown for TV Action (#40–56 [1971–1972]); TV Action in Countdown (#57–58 [1972]); TV Action + Countdown (#59–100 [1972–1973]); TV Action (#101–131 [1973]); TV Comic + TV Action (#1133–1147 [1973]); TV Comic (#1148–1181 [1973–1974]); TV Comic plus Tom & Jerry Weekly (#1182–1201 [1974]); TV Comic (#1202–1291 [1974–1976]); Mighty TV Comic (#1292–1352 [1976–1977]); TV Comic (#1353–1392 [1977–1978]); TV Comic with Target (#1393–1401 [1978]); and TV Comic (#1402–1430 [1978–1979]); as well as one strip from an associated annual: TV Comic Annual 1976 (1975). Some of these stories were originally in colour; some in part colour (for example one page was colour, the rest of the pages black and white); or in black and white. For DWCC all original black and white pages were colourised.TV Century 21 comic strip (1965–1967): reprinting Dalek stories which had been 'a huge success' in DWCC's 'sister publication, Doctor Who Magazine and were 'transferred... to give... more space to re-present them'. The strip was presented in its original colour format, and ran from issue 1 almost every week, completing in issue 19 (April 1994).Dell Movie Classics comic strip (December 1966): a one-off American publication (in the Dell Movie Classic series) featuring a story called Dr. Who and the Daleks with the Aaru Doctor (alternative First Doctor played by Peter Cushing). This was an adaptation of the Dr. Who and the Daleks film from 1965, in turn adapted from the Doctor Who television serial "The Daleks" from 1963 to 1964. The reprint appeared in its entirety in DWCC issue 9. Printed in original colour.
Doctor Who Magazine comic strip (1979–1991): DWCC reprinted mostly main strips from the Fourth, Fifth, Sixth, and Seventh Doctors; as well as completing the Seventh Doctor story "Evening's Empire" in the mid-run 'Autumn Special' (September 1993). The DWM main strip reprints began in DWCC issue 9 (July 1993) with a Fourth Doctor story. DWCC also reprinted some DWM secondary strips (essentially Doctorless), beginning in issue 23. All were originally in black and white (barring two pages of the Fifth Doctor story 'The Tides of Time' – DWM issue 66), and were specially colourised for DWCC (even when some had previously been colourised for reprints in Doctor Who Comics USA [1980–1986]).
The Incredible Hulk Presents comic strip (1989): a short run of a parallel Seventh Doctor strip in the short-lived The Incredible Hulk Presents comic. It launched in September 1989 with issue 1, and lasted twelve issues in total. It reprinted stories from US Marvel Comics' The Incredible Hulk from the 1970s; G.I. Joe: Special Missions (retitled for the UK as Action Force, later G.I. Joe the Action Force); and an Indiana Jones strip reprinting Marvel US adaptations of Indiana Jones and the Last Crusade and further Indiana Jones adventures. All these US strips were in colour. The Doctor Who strip, however, was in black and white. One story was later printed in DWM, Hunger from the Ends of Time!; and one unpublished strip, Doctor Conkerer!, was produced for the unprinted issue #13 later being printed in DWM 162. DWCC reprinted only four of the early stories, over three issues beginning in issue 21. All four one-part strips were colourised.

The comic strips in Doctor Who Classic Comics were presented in full colour, meaning strips were colourised when not originally released in colour.

The conclusion of Doctor Who Classic Comics was first announced in the Editorial of issue 26. There, assistant editor Marcus Hearn alluded to a 'big finale' the following month; continuing 'We're going out in style with Issue 27 – a special collector's edition with a wrap-round cover' and various other features. Issue 27 appeared with 'Final Jam-Packed Issue!' on the cover, and Hearn – once again providing the Editorial – echoed the previous issue in implicitly saying that the series had come to a natural end. 'With the finest of the Doctor Who strips's pre-Marvel heritage reprinted, our work is largely done. Other projects beckon for us'. With this final issue, DWCC completed the full run of the Countdown / TV Action run (excluding specials and annuals) during the mid-period of the Polystyle Third Doctor strips, before the strips left and then returned to TV Comic. However, of the two TV Comic periods (First, Second, half of the Third, and Fourth Doctors), only 32 of the potential 152 strips were ever reprinted (just over 20%). The situation was even worse with respect to the fifteen or so years of Doctor Who Magazine strips and (admitted far, far shorter run) of The Incredible Hulk Presents strips. That the publication was terminated for reasons other than having completed the Third Doctor Countdown / TV Action strips is the fact that the ongoing "Vworp Vworp" articles, which were printing a chronology of Doctor Who comic strips with short synopses, only reached then end of the Third Doctor Polystyle period.

Doctor Who Yearbooks (1992–1996) 

Between 1992 and 1996 Marvel UK published a number of Doctor Who Yearbooks – essentially annuals – containing articles, comic strips, and short fiction. These continued the tradition of Doctor Who Annuals that had been issued under a separate licence from the BBC by World Distributors between 1965 and 1985 (for the years 1966 to 1986); renaming themselves World International, Ltd. in 1981, but due to falling sales limiting their publishing activities before ceasing trading later that decade.

Doctor Who Poster Magazine (1994–1996) 

Between 1994 and 1996 Marvel UK published a number of Doctor Who Poster Magazines, produced in full colour with visual image based articles, each with a specific theme. After the first six issues the format of the magazine was changed, but only ran for another two issues before being cancelled.

DWM Parallel Publications: Panini Years (1995–present)

DWM related Doctor Who strips (1996–1997) 

Radio Times comic strip (1996–1997)

Special Editions (2002–present) 

From 2002 Doctor Who Magazine has been producing a regular series of "Special Editions", generally released three times a year. These are stand alone magazines themed around a specific topic and carrying a much higher page count than the regular magazine. Over the run, so far, there have been eight themes:

Doctor Who eras (2002–2014): These issues explored the stories in a Doctor's era, sometimes over a number of 'volumes'. This theme was named The Complete x Doctor for the classic series, and The Doctor Who Companion for the post-2005 series – although the last two of these have different names, the Official Guide covering the final part of the Eleventh Doctor's final season (April 2014), and The Year of the Doctor 50th Anniversary edition (August 2014). This strand of the "Special Editions" came to an end with these two releases, but is continued in the rebooted "Bookazine" series as of 2019 with the Twelfth Doctor.
Anniversaries (2003–): Beginning with We Love Doctor Who (November 2003), celebrating the 40th anniversary of the first broadcast of the TV show, the Special Editions have marked all the major milestones of the programme. In the case of the 50th Anniversary edition (August 2014), this publication also had the function of being the final part of the Doctor Who eras thematic, which post-2005 was labelled The Doctor Who Companion (in all but this and the penultimate instalment, tagged an Official Guide).
In Their Own Words (2005–2010): An overview of the programme's history produced chronologically. This series collected excerpts from interviews with Doctor Who cast and crew over the years 1963 to 2009. The series concluded in 2010.
Comic strip reprints (2006–2008): The Special Editions became the reprint format for the main comic strip for the Ninth Doctor (April 2006) and some of the mid-period Tenth Doctor (April 2008). These strips were, however, also collected in the Collected Edition format (2004–present) in The Cruel Sea (2014) for the Ninth Doctor; and The Widow's Curse (2009, Collected Tenth Doctor Comic Strips Volume 2).
Missing Episodes (2013): The three 2013 Special Editions published Telesnaps from missing episodes from the Hartnell and Troughton eras.
Sarah Jane Adventures (2009–2012): Three special editions between 2009 and 2012 covering the production of the "Doctor Who" television spin-off "The Sarah Jane Adventures".
Yearbooks (2015–): Beginning with the 2015 Yearbook (December 2014), these publications are issued once a year looking back over the previous year in Doctor Who.
Topics (2015–): In the wake of the first "Doctor Who Yearbook" (2015; published December 2014), the "Special Editions" devoted the other two releases of 2015 to specific topics: The Art of Doctor Who (April 2015) and The Music of Doctor Who (August 2015). This pattern of a Yearbook followed by two topics has continued to present.

Annual / Storybooks (2006–2010) 

Panini rebooted these in 2006 with the return of Doctor Who to television as an annual. Due to the success of the annual, BBC publishing retrieved the license for that designation, but allowed Panini to continue publishing a yearly Storybook, which they did for another four years.

Doctor Who Classics (IDW Comics) (2008–2014) 

In January 2008, IDW Publishing, an American comic book company, launched Doctor Who Classics, a monthly comic book series reprinting digitally colourised Fourth, Fifth, Sixth and Seventh Doctor strips from the early issues of DWM. The series was collected in trade paperbacks. The Dave Gibbons Collection was also released in an oversized hardback edition.

Doctor Who Insider Magazine (2011–2012) 

A North American publication that ran for nine issues, with two specials. It was features and articles based, with a more visual approach than Doctor Who Magazine. It also carried no comic strip.

Bookazines (2013–present) 

For the 50th anniversary of Doctor Who in 2013 three "bookazines" were published under the Doctor Who – 50 Years banner, featuring articles on the Doctor, his companions and the Daleks. These continued into 2014 and beyond, renamed The Essential Doctor Who, again with three issues released annually. In 2018, with the advent of the Thirteenth Doctor, a special one-off edition bookazine was released as part of the series called The Story of Doctor Who. After this, the range continued on with the title The Essential Doctor Who for one final release in February 2019. The series was replaced by The Doctor Who Companion range, with the same release schedule, beginning in June 2019.

Doctor Who: The Complete History (2015–2019) 
Beginning on 9 September 2015, Panini published a fortnightly partwork documenting the production of every Doctor Who TV story. Content in the partwork was largely based on Andrew Pixley's Archive features which were initially published in Doctor Who Magazine throughout the 80s, 90s and early 2000s and continue in numerous special editions (see above), however a considerable amount of new material was written exclusively for the books. The 90-part work was published in a multi-volume hardback form, in association with the BBC and Hachette. Each part features 1–4 stories. As is common with part-works, the volumes were not being released in chronological order by broadcast date, but in an order chosen "to reflect the variety and breadth of the series." In January 2018, it was confirmed that The Complete History was extended from 80 volumes to 90, to include all remaining Twelfth Doctor episodes up to "Twice Upon a Time".

Doctor Who Comic Strip Collected Editions (2004–present) 

Panini has been collecting the comic sections of the magazines into a number of Collected Editions (trade paperbacks) since 2004, beginning with the Fourth Doctor title The Iron Legion. These Collected Editions have not always been published in the order of original publication in Doctor Who Weekly/Magazine and its Yearbooks, Specials and associated publications. Panini have published two or three of these Collected Editions each year from 2004 to 2019, except 2010 and 2011 when the Collected Editions were put on hold for reasons unknown.

As of December 2019 there have been 29 volumes released, the most recent being Ground Zero, which features strips from the First, Third, Fourth, Fifth, and Seventh Doctors. As Panini have now collected all the main strips up to the end of the Twelfth Doctor continuity, they began focusing upon the 'past Doctors' period of the magazine (1994–1996, between the end of the Seventh Doctor continuity and beginning of the Eighth Doctor continuity) and other strips from across its publications throughout the years while they built up enough Thirteenth Doctor strips for a Collected Edition. The first Thirteenth Doctor Collected Edition (volume 30) is due in 2020.

The list of volumes below is placed in the original order of their publication in Doctor Who Magazine, which parallels the continuity of the television series, except for the 'past Doctors' period (1994–1996) when the publication began seeding one-off stories from all the past Doctors from the period prior to and including the Seventh. The Collected Editions with these stories are thus placed between the Seventh and Eighth Doctor continuities, except for irregularities, the most substantial being volume 28 The Clockwise War, which leads with the final strip of the Twelfth Doctor period, but also includes past Doctor stories from the Doctor Who Yearbooks published between 1994 and 1996. Many of the Collected Edition also feature bonus material, such as specially commissioned commentaries by the authors and artists, and sometimes short stories (the latter taken from Doctor Who Magazine) – these are signalled in the 'Notes' of the below table.

See also
 List of Doctor Who comic stories
 First Doctor comic stories
 Second Doctor comic stories
 Third Doctor comic stories
 Fourth Doctor comic strips
 Fifth Doctor comic stories
 Sixth Doctor comic stories
 Seventh Doctor comic stories
 Eighth Doctor comic stories
 Ninth Doctor comic stories
 Eleventh Doctor comic stories
 Twelfth Doctor comic stories
 Thirteenth Doctor comic stories
 Dalek comic strips, illustrated annuals and graphic novels
Doctor Who Adventures
Doctor Who – Battles in Time
Torchwood Magazine
Dreamwatch
:Category:Doctor Who comic strip characters

References
General

Scoones, Paul, The Comic Strip Companion: The Unofficial and Unauthorised Guide to Doctor Who in Comics: 1964–1979, Prestatyn: Telos, 2012
Spilsbury, Tom (Editor), Doctor Who Magazine: 500 DWM Issues, Tunbridge Wells: Panini Magazines, May 2016

Specific

External links 
 Creator Dez Skinn on launching Doctor Who Weekly
 Doctor Who Online – DWM section
 Gallifrey Base – Doctor Who Periodicals section
 Lovingwho's DWM Index
 Martyn Alner's DWM Website

1979 comics debuts
1979 establishments in the United Kingdom
Comics based on Doctor Who
Comics magazines published in the United Kingdom
Doctor Who magazines
Magazines established in 1979
Magazines published in London
Marvel UK titles
Monthly magazines published in the United Kingdom
Science fiction magazines published in the United Kingdom